Emilio Sánchez and Javier Sánchez were the defending champions, but Emilio did not compete this year.

Javier teamed up with Sergio Casal and successfully defended his title, by defeating Tomas Nydahl and Jörgen Windahl 6–2, 6–3 in the final.

Seeds

Draw

Draw

External links
 Official results archive (ATP)
 Official results archive (ITF)

Bologna Outdoor
1989 Grand Prix (tennis)